Christina may refer to:

People
 Christina (given name), shared by several people
 Christina (surname), shared by several people

Places
 Christina, Montana, unincorporated community, United States
 Christina, British Columbia, Canada
 Christina Lake (British Columbia), Canada
 Christina River, Delaware, United States, named after Christina, Queen regnant of Sweden
 Christina River (Alberta), river in Alberta
 Christina School District, Delaware, United States, named after Christina, Queen regnant of Sweden
 Fort Christina, first Swedish settlement in North America

Arts and entertainment
 Christina's World, an Andrew Wyeth painting of Christina Olson
 Christina (1929 film), a 1929 silent film
 Christina (1953 film), a West German drama film
 Christina (book series), a series of novels published by Playboy Press
 Christina (1984 film), a film based on the book series
 Christina, self-titled album by Christina Milian

Other
 Christina O, formerly Christina and HMCS Stormont, Aristotle Onassis' yacht

See also
 Cristina (disambiguation)
 Kristina (disambiguation)
 Saint Christina (disambiguation)